The Fröndenberg–Kamen railway is a single-track, partially electrified and partially disused railway line in the German state of North Rhine-Westphalia.  It runs from Fröndenberg via Unna to Unna-Königsborn and formerly on to Kamen.

History
The Fröndenberg-Kamen line was built at the turn of the 20th Century as a railway branch line by the Royal railway divisions of Elberfeld and Essen of the Prussian state railways to connect, in the form of an S-shaped curve, four stations on major east-west routes, which were built in the second half of the 19th century by three competing major private railway companies in Westphalia (from north to south):
Kamen station on the Dortmund–Hamm line, opened by the Cologne-Minden Railway Company in 1847,
Unna-Königsborn station on the Welver–Sterkrade line, opened by the Royal Westphalian Railway Company in 1876,
Unna station on the Dortmund–Soest line, opened by the Bergisch-Märkische Railway Company in 1855,
Fröndenberg station on the Hagen–Warburg line, also opened by the Bergisch-Märkische Railway Company in 1870.

The first section was opened by the Royal Railway Division of Elberfeld on 2 January 1899 between Fröndenberg and Unna.

The next section from Unna to Unna-Königsborn was a joint project with the Royal Railway Division of Essen and built in just over a year. It was opened on 1 April 1900, originally for freight only.

The last part, from Unna-Königsborn to Kamen was the responsibility of the Essen Division alone. Only half a year later, the line was completed on 1 November 1900 and opened for freight. Almost a year later, on 1 October 1901, the first passenger train ran between Unna and Kamen.

Closures

In early 1926, passenger traffic was discontinued on the northern section between Unna and Kamen. The Unna-Kamen-Werne light railway was opened in 1909 on a similar route as an overland tramway (interurban). It closed on 14 December 1950.

On 3 June 1955, freight traffic between Königsborn and Kamen was also discontinued and the line was subsequently dismantled. The former line can easily be identified from aerial photographs.

Current operations

Electrification of the Unn–Königsborn section was completed on 25 May 1984. The Fröndenberg–Unna section is still a non-electrified branch line with a top speed of 60 km/h. To increase speeds, level crossings are being upgraded. It is served only by the Hönnetal-Bahn (RB 54), which continues over the Letmathe–Fröndenberg line via Menden and the Hönne Valley Railway to Neuenrade at 60-minute intervals.

Prior to the closure of the Westphalian line between Welver and Unna-Königsborn in 1968, passenger services were established on the line between Unna and Unna-Königsborn on 26 May 1963, continuing to Dortmund Stadthaus station.

In 1972 a regular interval regional service was established from Unna via Unna-Königsborn, Dortmund Stadthaus and  Dortmund-Dorstfeld to Dortmund-Marten Süd, which was extended in 1983 to Dortmund-Lütgendortmund. This was a direct precursor of line S 4 of the Rhine-Ruhr S-Bahn. In preparation for the S-Bahn,  electrification of the line from Unna to Unna-Königsborn was completed on 25 May 1984 and on 28 June 1984 it was upgraded with a top speed of 80 km/h. S-Bahn services commenced on 3 June 1984 and operates at 20-minute intervals.

Notes

Railway lines in North Rhine-Westphalia
Railway lines opened in 1899
1899 establishments in Germany
Buildings and structures in Unna (district)
Unna